Chaudhary Brahm Prakash Ayurved Charak Sansthan an autonomous institution under GNCTD is an Ayurvedic college & hospital located in Village Khera Dabar New Delhi, India. The Sansthan is named in the honor of Delhi's first chief minister Chaudhary Brahm Prakash. Presently the institute has 125 BAMS seats and 36 Post-graduation seats. It is Asia's largest Ayurvedic hospital.

References 

Hospitals in Delhi
Ayurveda hospitals